New Cathedral of Plasencia or Catedral de Asunción de Nuestra Señora is a Roman Catholic cathedral located in the town of Plasencia, Region of Extremadura, Spain. It is dedicated to the Virgin Mary.

History
The cathedral consists of two buildings: the old (Catedral Vieja), dedicated to Saint Paul, and the new (Catedral Nueva). Construction began in the 13th-century in a mostly Romanesque style. The 15th-century new church was built in Gothic architectural style with high ceilings. The main retablo was built in the 17th-century, carved by Gregorio Fernández and painted by Francisco Ricci. The choirs are delicately carved. The old church now houses the Cathedral museum.

Gallery

References

Buildings and structures in the Province of Cáceres
Plasencia
Churches in Extremadura
Roman Catholic cathedrals in Extremadura
15th-century Roman Catholic church buildings in Spain
Romanesque architecture in Extremadura 
Gothic architecture in Extremadura